Be Happy is a Singaporean Chinese drama which was telecasted on Singapore's free-to-air channel, MediaCorp Channel 8. It stars Fann Wong , Chen Hanwei , Zhang Yaodong , Paige Chua , Guo Liang , Vivian Lai , Zen Chong , Apple Hong & Wayne Chua as the casts of the series. It made its debut on 15 March 2011 and ended on 11 April 2011. This drama serial consists of 20 episodes, and was screened on every weekday night at 9.00 pm. This drama would be the second drama to be broadcast in Dolby Digital after Breakout.

Cast

See also

 List of Be Happy episodes
 List of programmes broadcast by Mediacorp Channel 8

Singapore Chinese dramas
2011 Singaporean television series debuts
2011 Singaporean television series endings
Channel 8 (Singapore) original programming